Robert David Mackenzie (born 4 December 1952) is a British businessman, with experience in leadership roles at consumer services businesses. He was the Executive Chairman of The AA (Automobile Association) from 2014 to 2017. He was the Chairman of Northgate plc until his retirement in 2015.

Early life
He attended Bablake Grammar School in Coventry, then in Warwickshire. He attended Trent Polytechnic (now NTU). He qualified as a Chartered Accountant with KPMG in 1978.

Career
His previous experience includes having been Chairman and CEO of National Car Parks and Green Flag, CEO of Sea Containers, Chairman of PHS Group plc and senior executive board positions with a number of other companies.

The AA
In June 2014 AA was taken public, in a management buy-in, for £1.18bn. Mackenzie became the company's Executive Chairman on 26 June 2014, on a salary of £750,000, and also sat on the AA's Nomination Committee. At the time the AA had around £3bn in debt.

He was sacked as Executive Chairman of The AA on 1 August 2017, for "gross misconduct" after a fight in a hotel bar, although his son Peter said his father had "tendered his resignation" due to a "mental health issue... He is very unwell and has been admitted to hospital."

Personal life
Mackenzie is married to Jane, and has two daughters and three sons. He lives in Warwickshire, and enjoys fishing on the River Test.

References

External links
 The AA Board
 Telegraph May 2016

1952 births
Alumni of Nottingham Trent University
English accountants
People educated at Bablake School
People from Coventry
People from Warwick District
The Automobile Association
Living people